Whitney (formerly East Las Vegas) is an unincorporated town and census-designated place in Clark County, Nevada, United States. The population was 38,585 at the 2010 census.

Background
Stowell E. Whitney, a dairy farmer from Bunkerville, Nevada, purchased a ranch in the area in the 1910s. The town of Whitney was established in 1931, when Whitney subdivided his ranch due to the construction of the Boulder Highway. Much of this land is now within Henderson city limits. He didn't attract many buyers, since this took place during the Great Depression. A Whitney post office was opened the following year. The town was officially founded in 1942 by the Clark County Commission, and that year Whitney was given official borders. The town was renamed as East Las Vegas in 1958, in response to a petition signed by almost all the residents. The name was changed back to Whitney in 1993.

Prior to the 1970s, Whitney was one of a few small communities between Las Vegas and Henderson along Boulder Highway (which was US 93, US 95 and US 466 at the time). Whitney Elementary School was a converted barracks. It housed grades from first to seventh until the 1960s; after that, seventh-graders were moved to Henderson Junior High.  In the early years, the town's post office was operated by John and Nellie Bunch, owners of much of the Whitney property and surrounding areas.  The town consisted of three streets running east and west: Whitney Avenue, Keenan Avenue, and Missouri Avenue.  Cross streets running north and south were 1st Street, 2nd Street, and 3rd Street. Older students attended Basic High School in Henderson.

In the early 1990s, the outward growth of development in Las Vegas and Henderson, as well as the construction of the Interstate 515 bypass of Whitney, had a negative effect on businesses in the area. Business began to recover in the 2000s. The area has seen several new housing developments on vacant land.

It is home to Sam Boyd Stadium (formerly Las Vegas Stadium, Las Vegas Silver Bowl, and Sam Boyd Silver Bowl), the former home venue of the UNLV Rebels college football team.

Geography

Government
As an unincorporated town, Whitney is directly managed by the Clark County Commission. Federally, it is split between the 1st and 3rd Congressional Districts, but with redistributing will be in the 1st congressional district entirely in 2023, represented by Democrat Dina Titus . In state politics, it is part of State Senate District 7, represented by Democrat Roberta Lange and Assembly District 18, which is represented by Democrat Venicia Considine.

Demographics

At the 2000 census there were 18,273 people, 7,090 households, and 4,502 families living in the CDP. The racial makeup of the CDP was 72.24% White, 2.10% African American, 60.12% Native American, 3.81% Asian, 0.4% Pacific Islander, 11.04% from other races, and 4.53% from two or more races. Hispanic or Latino of any race were 25.29%.

Of the 7,090 households 28.7% had children under the age of 18 living with them, 42.8% were married couples living together, 14.2% had a female householder with no husband present, and 36.5% were non-families. 27.8% of households were one person and 6.9% were one person aged 65 or older. The average household size was 2.57 and the average family size was 3.14.

The age distribution was 25.1% under the age of 18, 9.2% from 18 to 24, 31.3% from 25 to 44, 23.4% from 45 to 64, and 11.0% 65 or older. The median age was 35 years. For every 100 females, there were 104.8 males. For every 100 females age 18 and over, there were 103.8 males.

The median household income was $36,536 and the median family income  was $41,504. Males had a median income of $30,833 versus $23,988 for females. The per capita income for the CDP was $16,969. About 8.2% of families and 9.7% of the population were below the poverty line, including 13.1% of those under age 18 and 5.6% of those age 65 or over.

See also

References

External links 

 Whitney Town Advisory Board

 
1931 establishments in Nevada
Census-designated places in Clark County, Nevada
Las Vegas Valley
Populated places established in 1931
Unincorporated towns in Nevada